2008 Pekan Olahraga National or the Indonesia National Games XVII were a major multi-sport event in Indonesia which took place in Samarinda, East Kalimantan, from 5–17 July 2008. A total of 7,946 athletes participated in the biggest-ever Pekan Olahraga Nasional and also the first on the island of Borneo. These games make Samarinda the second city to host Pekan Olahraga Nasional outside of the island of Java and Sumatra, after Makassar hosted the 1957 Pekan Olahraga Nasional.

Samarinda was awarded the right to host the games over three competitors, Pekanbaru, Bandung, and Semarang. Later, Pekanbaru was chosen to be the host of eighteenth edition of the games in 2012.

Host selection

Mascots
Mascots for the games are three endangered species of the East Kalimantan province and also representing three elements: land, water, and air.
Hornbill
Mahakam dolphin
Orangutan

Sports

Aerospace games
Hang gliding
Model aircraft
Parachuting
Paragliding
Aquatics
Diving
Swimming
Synchronized swimming
Water polo
Archery
Athletics
Badminton
Baseball and Softball
Basketball
Billiards
Bowling
Boxing
Chess
Climbing
Contract bridge
Cycling
BMX
Road
Mountain biking
Dancesport
Equestrian
Fencing
Finswimming
Football
Golf
Gymnastics
Artistic
Rhythmic
Aerobic
Hockey
Judo
Karate
Kenpo
Pencak silat
Marching band
Motorcycling
Rowing and Canoeing
Sailing
Sepak takraw
Shooting
Skating
Squash
Table tennis
Taekwondo
Tarung Derajat
Tennis
Volleyball
Indoor
Beach
Water skiing
Weightlifting, Powerlifting, and Bodybuilding
Wrestling
Wushu

Co-hosts
Although Samarinda is the main host for the games, several sports also played in other cities in East Kalimantan, they are:
Balikpapan
Berau
Bontang
Kutai Kartanegara
Tarakan

Medal table

References

External links
  Situs web resmi
  Jadwal pertandingan PON XVII Kaltim
  PON XVII Terancam Dipindah
  Jumlah peserta menurut provinsi dari Sekretariat PON XVII-2008

Pekan Olahraga Nasional
Pekan Olahraga Nasional
2008 in Indonesian sport